Dzhegov Rock (‘Dzhegova Skala’ \'dzhe-go-va ska-'la\) is the solitary rock in eastern Prince Charles Strait, South Shetland Islands in Antarctica extending 40 m in southeast-northwest direction and 30 m in southwest-northeast direction. It is “named after Captain Simeon Dzhegov (1938-2011), Director in 1987 of the Bulgarian company Ocean Fisheries – Burgas whose ships operated in the waters of South Georgia, Kerguelen, the South Orkney Islands, South Shetland Islands and Antarctic Peninsula from 1970 to the early 1990s.  The Bulgarian fishermen, along with those of the Soviet Union, Poland and East Germany are the pioneers of modern Antarctic fishing industry.”

Location
British mapping of the area in 1822, 1972 and 2009.

Maps
 Chart of South Shetland including Coronation Island, &c. from the exploration of the sloop Dove in the years 1821 and 1822 by George Powell Commander of the same. Scale ca. 1:200000. London: Laurie, 1822.
British Antarctic Territory. Scale 1:200000 topographic map. DOS 610 Series, Sheet W 61 54. Directorate of Overseas Surveys. Tolworth, UK, 1972
 South Shetland Islands: Elephant, Clarence and Gibbs Islands. Scale 1:220000 topographic map. UK Antarctic Place-names Committee, 2009
 Antarctic Digital Database (ADD). Scale 1:250000 topographic map of Antarctica. Scientific Committee on Antarctic Research (SCAR). Since 1993, regularly upgraded and updated

Notes

References
 Dzhegov Rock. SCAR Composite Gazetteer of Antarctica

External links
 Dzhegov Rock. Copernix satellite image

 

Islands of the South Shetland Islands
Ocean Fisheries – Burgas Co
Bulgaria and the Antarctic